Lake Sülüklü, for "Lake of the Leeches", is a freshwater lake located at Şehitkamil district in Gaziantep Province, Turkey.

References

Suluklu (Gaziantep)
Landforms of Gaziantep Province
Şehitkamil District